Gherry Setya Adhi Nugraha (born December 21, 1988) is an Indonesian footballer that currently plays for Persela Lamongan in the Indonesia Super League.

Hounors

Clubs
Pelita Jaya U-21 :
Indonesia Super League U-21 champions : 1 (2008-09)
Arema Indonesia :
Indonesia Super League champions : 1 (2009-10)

References

External links

1988 births
Association football forwards
Living people
Indonesian footballers
Liga 1 (Indonesia) players
Arema F.C. players
Pelita Jaya FC players
Persela Lamongan players
Indonesian Premier Division players
Persmin Minahasa players
Footballers at the 2006 Asian Games
Asian Games competitors for Indonesia